The 1942 Arkansas Razorbacks football team represented the University of Arkansas in the Southwest Conference (SWC) during the 1942 college football season. In their first and only year under head coach George Cole, the Razorbacks compiled a 3–7 record (0–6 against SWC opponents), finished in last place in the SWC, and were outscored by their opponents by a combined total of 228 to 89.

Schedule

References

Arkansas
Arkansas Razorbacks football seasons
Arkansas Razorbacks football